Anti-Jewish Action League of Sweden (in Swedish: Sveriges Antijudiska Kampförbund) was an anti-Semitic political organization in Sweden. The group was founded in 1941 by veteran anti-Semite Einar Åberg. The organization was small, often consisting only of Åberg himself. Åberg's propagandistic activities eventually led to legislation, sometimes referred to as Lex Åberg, adding the crime of agitation against a population group to the Swedish criminal code.

The first point of the so-called league's statutes read: "the goal is: the total annihilation of Jewry in Sweden".
The organization was later disbanded, but Åberg continued his political work.

Einar Åberg

Einar Åberg was born on April 20, 1890 in Gothenburg, he died on October 6, 1970 in Sollentuna. Åberg became anti-Semitic in 1922 and figured in many different anti-Jewish and Swedish Nazi associations and parties, but never being a member of them. He had international contacts, including the Ku Klux Klan and Savitri Devi, who was also openly Nazi and active in Europe's post-war Nazi and Fascist networks and the two met at least once.

In October 1941, Åberg bought a bookstore, on which he covered the shop window with an infamous sign saying: "Jews and half-Jews not allowed here". This caused upset reactions among locals, and fights and brawls broke out several times outside the shop. Åberg was sentenced to fines for aggravated behavior and was ordered to take down the sign. He then merely changed the sign to one saying: "only Swedes allowed".

Between 1941 and 1945 he was sentenced on nine occasions to fines for his anti-Semitic agitation. 
He wandered the streets with a sandwich board accusing the Jews of being the cause of World War II, this led to him getting into several fights on the streets with anti-racist locals again.

When the Holocaust became widely known in the aftermath of WWII, Åberg was one of the first living persons to deny it had happened, he continued to pursue this conspiracy theory long after the war ended.

References

Antisemitism in Sweden
Nazism in Sweden
Swedish Holocaust deniers
Far-right politics in Sweden
Jews and Judaism in Sweden
The Holocaust and Sweden